Meredith Averill is an American television writer and producer. Born in Pottsville, Pennsylvania, Averill graduated from New York University with a degree in screenwriting.

Career
Averill began her career as an assistant to TV writer/producers André Nemec and Josh Appelbaum, then became a writer for the ABC Family mini-series Samurai Girl, ABC's Life on Mars and ABC's Happy Town. Averill then spent three years on CBS's The Good Wife as a writer and producer.

In May 2013 she signed an overall deal with CBS Television Studios, where she was the creator and executive producer of The CW science fiction teen drama Star-Crossed.

After Star-Crossed's cancellation, she then went on to work as a Co-Executive Producer for the CW's Jane the Virgin and CBS's Pure Genius.  She served as the co-showrunner/executive producer for Netflix's series The Haunting of Hill House.

In 2018, Averill came on board as the Co-Showrunner/Executive Producer for Netflix's adaptation of Locke & Key, which she developed for television along with Carlton Cuse and Aron Eli Coleite.

In December 2020, Netflix announced it had picked up Locke & Key for a second and third season and signed Averill to a three-year overall deal.

Filmography

Television
The numbers in writing credits refer to the number of episodes.

Awards
Averill is a two-time Golden Globe nominee and a four-time nominee of the Writers Guild of America Award. She was chosen as one of Variety's Top 10 TV Writers to Watch for 2013. In 2019, she was awarded the Bram Stoker Award for Superior Achievement in a Screenplay for an episode of The Haunting of Hill House she wrote entitled "The Bent-Neck Lady."

References

External links

Living people
American television writers
American women screenwriters
People from Pottsville, Pennsylvania
Showrunners
Television show creators
Tisch School of the Arts alumni
Year of birth missing (living people)